The Roman Catholic Diocese of Holguín (erected 8 January 1979) is a suffragan diocese of the Archdiocese of Santiago de Cuba.

Ordinaries
Héctor Luis Lucas Peña Gómez (1979 - 2005) - Bishop Emeritus
Emilio Aranguren Echeverria (2005 - )

External links and references

Holguin
Holguin
Holguin
Roman Catholic Ecclesiastical Province of Santiago de Cuba